Sérgio Franco de Menezes is a retired Brazilian sprinter.

References

sports-reference.com

1960s births
Living people
Brazilian male sprinters
Olympic athletes of Brazil
Athletes (track and field) at the 1987 Pan American Games
Athletes (track and field) at the 1988 Summer Olympics
Athletes (track and field) at the 1992 Summer Olympics
Universiade medalists in athletics (track and field)
Universiade silver medalists for Brazil
Medalists at the 1989 Summer Universiade
Pan American Games athletes for Brazil